Merton Edward Hanks (born March 12, 1968) is a former American football player who was a safety in the National Football League (NFL) for nine seasons during the 1990s. He is currently a Senior Associate Commissioner for the Pac-12.

College career 
Hanks attended Lake Highlands High School, where he was a district track and field champion. He went on to the University of Iowa, earning all-Big Ten honors at cornerback. However, at the NFL scouting combine, his 40-yard dashes were extremely slow, and he was not drafted until the fifth round by the San Francisco 49ers.

Professional career 
Despite his low selection, Hanks was selected for four Pro Bowl and three All-Pro teams. He was well known for his interceptions and returns, as well as his unique "chicken dance" celebrations which were later emulated by basketball star Shaquille O'Neal. He was a member of the 1994 San Francisco team that won Super Bowl XXIX. Hanks finished his career with the Seattle Seahawks, retiring in 1999.

Executive career 
Hanks was previously the assistant director of operations for the National Football League, and then the NFL Vice President of Operations in charge of player conduct. He regularly goes on speaking tours. Hanks began his tenure as Conference USA Senior Associate Commissioner in July 2016, where he is responsible for the conference’s football and baseball operations, including officiating, scheduling, game operations, player conduct and safety and more.
On September 8, 2020 Merton Hanks became the Senior Associate Commissioner, Football Operation for the PAC-12 conference.

References

1968 births
Living people
American football safeties
American football cornerbacks
Iowa Hawkeyes football players
National Football League executives
San Francisco 49ers players
Seattle Seahawks players
All-American college football players
National Conference Pro Bowl players
Players of American football from Dallas